"Amazing" is a song co-written, produced, and performed by English singer-songwriter George Michael, released by Aegean and Sony Music on 1 March 2004. It was included on Michael's fifth studio album, Patience. The song is about and dedicated to George Michael's then-partner at the time, Kenny Goss. The song reached  1 in Hungary, Italy, Poland and Spain, and it also topped three US Billboard dance charts.

Music video
The music video for the song was directed by Matthew Rolston. The video was filmed in London, United Kingdom in late 2003. It shows a modern club-like setting where a holographic performance by George Michael is projected in front of a long lounge. George is also shown amongst the crowd, and in small intervals singing in front of a black background.

Critical reception
Stephen Thomas Erlewine from AllMusic chose the track as one of the album's track picks. BBC News Online's Michael Osborn said the song "sends us hurtling back to the late 80s." Sal Cinquemani called the song "catchy yet un-amazing."

On 26 December 2016, a day after Michael's death, Rolling Stone compiled a list of "20 Essential Songs" by Michael, and described "Amazing" as "a dancey soft-rock number."

Chart performance
On 1 March 2004, "Amazing" was released in the United Kingdom. The song debuted at number four on the UK Singles Chart, selling 41,000 copies in its first week. Outside of the UK, the song was also successful. It reached number one in Spain, Italy, Poland, and Hungary.

When George Michael appeared on The Oprah Winfrey Show on 26 May 2004 to promote the album, he performed the song on the show. "Amazing" was released in the United States. Michael had previously found success in the dance clubs with "Monkey" (1988) and "Star People" (1997), and "Amazing" became his third release to reach the top on the Billboards Hot Dance Club Songs chart. It also performed well on the Hot Dance Airplay chart, where it reached the top spot and stayed there for four weeks.

Track listingsUK CD1 "Amazing" – 4:25
 "Freeek! '04" – 4:28UK CD2'
 "Amazing" (album version) – 4:25
 "Amazing" (Jack 'N' Rory 7-inch vocal mix) – 5:56
 "Amazing" (Full Intention club mix) – 8:05

Charts

Weekly charts

Year-end charts

Certifications and sales

Release history

See also
 List of number-one dance airplay hits of 2004 (U.S.)
 List of number-one dance singles of 2004 (U.S.)
 List of number-one hits of 2004 (Italy)
 List of number-one singles of 2004 (Spain)

References

2004 singles
2004 songs
Epic Records singles
George Michael songs
Music videos directed by Matthew Rolston
Number-one singles in Hungary
Number-one singles in Italy
Number-one singles in Poland
Number-one singles in Spain
Song recordings produced by George Michael
Songs written by George Michael
Sony Music UK singles